Clithon lentiginosum is a species of a freshwater snail with an operculum, a nerite. It is an aquatic gastropod mollusk in the family Neritidae, the nerites.

Human use
It is a part of ornamental pet trade for freshwater aquaria.

References

External links 

Neritidae
Gastropods described in 1855